San Giorgio Piacentino (or ) is a comune (municipality) in the Province of Piacenza in the Italian region Emilia-Romagna, located about  northwest of Bologna and about  south of Piacenza.

San Giorgio Piacentino borders the following municipalities: Carpaneto Piacentino, Gropparello, Podenzano, Ponte dell'Olio, Pontenure, Vigolzone.

References

External links
 Official website 

Cities and towns in Emilia-Romagna